The Baikal Highway is a federal highway in Russia. Its official designation is  federal highway R258 "Baikal". It part of the Trans-Siberian Highway and of the AH6 route of the Asian Highway Network. It is named after the Russian Lake Baikal.

The road has 296 bridges and no tunnels. There are no toll segments on the highway.

Gallery

See also
Circumbaikal Highway

References

M51
M53
M55

Roads in Siberia